Kakori is a town and a nagar panchayat in Lucknow district in the Indian state of Uttar Pradesh, 14 km north of Lucknow. Kakori was a centre Urdu poetry, literature and the Qadiriya Qalandari Sufi order. On 9 August 1925  Indian revolutionaries robbed a train of government funds in Kakori, an incident known as the Kakori Train robbery.

Kakori Train Action

The town has a memorial to several revolutionaries involved in the Indian independence movement who looted a train near Kakori in August 1925 in what is known as the Kakori Train Action. The village is still served by Kakori railway station.

Geography
It has an average elevation of 121 metres (396 feet).

Demographics
 India census, Kakori had a population of 16,731. Males constitute 53% of the population and females 47%. Kakori has an average literacy rate of 46%, lower than the national average of 59.5%: male literacy is 51%, and female literacy is 40%. In Kakori, 13% of the population is under 6 years of age.

Popular culture
Kakori has been used as a setting for various movies, of which Junoon (1978) and Umrao Jaan (1981) are two examples. Anwar (2007) also featured the town.

Villages 
Kakori block contains the following 83 villages:

The villages in Kakori block have a total population of 152,277, in 26,735 households.

Notable people
Mohsin Kakorvi (1805–1905), Indian Urdu poet, a well known writer of naats during his time

See also
Dashdoi

References

Cities and towns in Lucknow district